State Highway 120 (SH 120) is a  state highway in Fremont County, Colorado. SH 120's western terminus is at SH 115 east of Florence, and the eastern terminus is at U.S. Route 50 (US 50) east of Penrose.

Route description

SH 120 starts at a junction with SH 115 east of Florence, heading east across the Arkansas River and ending at a junction with US 50 just east of Penrose.

Major intersections

See also

 List of state highways in Colorado

References

External links

120
Transportation in Fremont County, Colorado